The 1991 Mercantile Credit Classic was the twelfth edition of the professional snooker tournament which took place from 1–12 January 1991 with ITV coverage beginning on the 5th. The tournament has now been moved to the Bournemouth International Centre in Dorset after 4 years in Blackpool.

Jimmy White won his second Classic title beating Stephen Hendry 10–4 in the final. This was the second time in a month White beat Hendry in a major final after the World Matchplay. He led 9–0, one frame from a rare "whitewash" final win. Hendry avoided this by winning 4 in a row. White closed the match out 10–4.

Main draw

Final

Century breaks
(Including qualifying rounds)

135  Tony Chappel
131, 126  Ken Doherty
124  Brian Morgan
112  Tony Jones
112  Kirk Stevens
110  Stephen Hendry
108, 104  Neal Foulds
108  James Wattana
108  Terry Whitthread
106, 101  Tony Drago
106  Mark Bennett
102  Alan McManus

References

Classic (snooker)
Classic
Classic
Classic
Sport in Bournemouth